Joe's Pizza, also called Famous Joe's Pizza, is a pizzeria located in Greenwich Village, Manhattan, New York City on Carmine Street near Bleecker Street. The restaurant is known for serving a classic New York street styled pizza and has been called a "Greenwich Village institution." The pizzeria serves by the slice or by full pie.

Locations
In addition to its original location in Greenwich Village, Joe's Pizza has other locations in Manhattan at 150 East 14th Street, 1435 Broadway, and 124 Fulton Street; in Brooklyn, at 216 Bedford Avenue; and in Ann Arbor, Michigan, at 1107 S University Ave.  In the late 2010s, three locations were opened in Shanghai, China, in Jing'an, Xuhui, and Changning.

History
Joe's was founded in 1975 by Pino "Joe" Pozzuoli, an Italian immigrant originally from Naples, Italy. Joe's Pizza is considered a classic by the slice pizza and a favorite among tourists. The restaurant briefly closed in 2005, but has since reopened.

In popular culture
Joe's Pizza appears in the 2001 video game Grand Theft Auto III as it is located in two different areas of the game. However, both of the pizza parlors are inaccessible to the player. The pizza parlor appears once again in Grand Theft Auto: Liberty City Stories and it remains inaccessible to the player but you can start a side mission in-game titled "Pizza Boy."

In the 2004 film, Spider-Man 2, Peter Parker is working at Joe's Pizza as a delivery boy, but is fired due to insubordination and excessive delivery mishaps. The pizzeria has gained notability since its appearance in the movie, and several of its New York locations tout its appearance in the film.

In 2022, Joe's Pizza made its Marvel Cinematic Universe debut in a commercial for Doctor Strange in the Multiverse of Madness in the form of a food truck. Like Spider-Man 2, Sam Raimi also directed the film.

See also
 List of Italian restaurants
 List of restaurants in New York City

References

External links
 

1975 establishments in New York City
Italian-American culture in New York City
Pizzerias in New York City
Restaurants established in 1975
Restaurants in Manhattan
Italian restaurants in New York City